Cuieiras River is a river of the Barcelos municipality of Amazonas state in north-western Brazil.
It is a tributary of the Demini River.

The river rises near the Serra do Aracá, the mountain after which the  Serra do Aracá State Park is named, and provides a route to the foot of the mountain.

See also
List of rivers of Amazonas

References

Sources

Rivers of Amazonas (Brazilian state)